Creightons Plc is a manufacturer of consumer goods headquartered in Peterborough, United Kingdom, whose shares are listed on the FTSE Fledgling Index. It was first listed on the London Stock Exchange in 1987. It manufactures and markets personal care and beauty products for the consumer and trade market.

References

External links

Manufacturing companies established in 1975
Manufacturing companies of the United Kingdom
Companies based in Cambridgeshire
1975 establishments in England
Companies listed on the London Stock Exchange